Guy D. Penny (May 13, 1928 – April 8, 2019) was an American football coach and player. He served as the head football coach at Morehead State University in Morehead, Kentucky from 1959 to 1967, compiling a record of 38–40–2.

Penny played college football at the University of Mississippi and later served as a physical education faculty member at Middle Tennessee State University from 1970 to 1993.

Head coaching record

College football

References

External links
 

1928 births
2019 deaths
Middle Tennessee State University faculty
Morehead State Eagles football coaches
Ole Miss Rebels football players
UT Martin Skyhawks football coaches
High school baseball coaches in the United States
High school basketball coaches in Alabama
High school football coaches in Alabama
University of Southern Mississippi alumni
People from Piedmont, Alabama
Players of American football from Alabama